They Cloned Tyrone is an upcoming American science fiction comedy mystery film directed by Juel Taylor in his feature film directorial debut, from a screenplay by Taylor and Tony Rettenmaier. The film stars John Boyega, Teyonah Parris, Kiefer Sutherland, and Jamie Foxx. Foxx also serves as a producer of the film.

They Cloned Tyrone is scheduled to be released on July 21, 2023, by Netflix.

Premise
A series of eerie events thrusts an unlikely trio onto the trail of a nefarious government conspiracy in this pulpy mystery caper.

Cast
 John Boyega as Fontaine
 Teyonah Parris as Yo-Yo
 Jamie Foxx as Slick Charles
 Kiefer Sutherland
 J. Alphonse Nicholson

Production
In February 2019, Brian Tyree Henry joined the cast of the film, with Juel Taylor set to make his feature film directorial debut from a screenplay he wrote alongside Tony Rettenmaier. In October 2019, John Boyega joined the cast of the film, replacing Henry, with Netflix set to distribute. In September 2020, Jamie Foxx and Teyonah Parris joined the cast of the film.

Principal photography began in December 2020, in Atlanta, Georgia.

Release
They Cloned Tyrone is scheduled to be released on July 21, 2023, by Netflix.

Marketing
The first trailer for They Cloned Tyrone was released on September 24, 2022, during Netflix's global fan event, Tudum. It featured a rendition of the Gap Band's 1982 song "You Dropped a Bomb on Me". Several critics noted the Blaxploitation influence in the trailer. Jeremy Fuster of TheWrap drew comparisons between the film's premise and the Tuskegee Syphilis Study, a government-funded medical experiment done on Black subjects in Tuskegee, Alabama.

References

External links
 

2023 comedy films
2023 directorial debut films
2023 science fiction films
2020s American films
2020s comedy mystery films
2020s English-language films
2020s science fiction comedy films
American comedy mystery films
American science fiction comedy films
Blaxploitation films
Films about cloning
Films shot in Atlanta
Hood films
Upcoming directorial debut films
Upcoming English-language films
Upcoming Netflix original films